The black legskate (Indobatis ori) is a species of smooth skate native to the Indian Ocean off of Madagascar and Mozambique. It is the only species in the monotypic genus Indobatis. It is dark-colored, greyish-black or brownish on the dorsum, ventrally lighter.

References

External links
 Species Description of Anacanthobatis ori at www.shark-references.com

Anacanthobatidae
Fish described in 1967

Taxonomy articles created by Polbot